Martin Sebastian Andersson (born 15 July 1991) is a Swedish professional footballer who plays as a forward for Bundesliga club 1. FC Köln.

Club career

Early career 
Andersson started out playing youth football for his hometown club Ängelholms FF when he was five. A couple of years later he also simultaneously started playing for Vinslövs IF. This was because his parents had separated and he was living every other week in different locations with each parent so he also had to switch between the two clubs every other week. When he turned 15 he joined the youth team of Helsingborgs IF but only a couple of years later the club discontinued the age group that he was playing for and as he wasn't given a first team contract he had to leave.

He then went back to Ängelholm where he, as a seventeen-year-old, was put straight into the club's U21 team. After making his first-team debut in 2010, Andersson's first highly successful season was the 2011 Superettan, in which he was one of the top ten goalscorers in the second tier of the Swedish football league system. Due to his success he was signed by Allsvenskan club Kalmar FF after the season.

On 1 August 2014, Andersson joined Djurgården. He made 39 competitive appearances and scored 16 goals for the Stockholm team before being sold to IFK Norrköping in 2016.

FC Kaiserslautern 
On 31 August 2017, the last day of the 2017 summer transfer window, Andersson signed a three-year contract with 2. Bundesliga side 1. FC Kaiserslautern.

Union Berlin 
In June 2018, following Kaiserslautern's relegation, 1. FC Union Berlin announced Andersson would join the club on a free transfer for the 2018–19 season having agreed a two-year contract.

FC Köln 
On 15 September 2020, Andersson moved to Bundesliga club 1. FC Köln and signed a contract until 2023. The transfer fee paid to Union Berlin was reported as €6 million. On 19 September 2020, Andersson scored on his Bundesliga debut for FC Köln in a 2–3 loss to Hoffenheim.

International career
Andersson made his only appearance for the national under-21 team on 15 November 2011 in a game against Malta. He made his senior debut in January 2017 in a friendly game against the Ivory Coast. He scored his first two goals for Sweden four days later, in a 6–0 thrashing of Slovakia.

Andersson scored his first competitive international goal in a UEFA Euro 2020 qualifying game against the Faroe Islands which Sweden won 3–0.

Career statistics

Club

International

International goals
Scores and results list Sweden's goal tally first.

References

External links
 

Living people
1991 births
People from Ängelholm Municipality
Association football forwards
Swedish footballers
Sweden under-21 international footballers
Sweden international footballers
Ängelholms FF players
Kalmar FF players
Djurgårdens IF Fotboll players
IFK Norrköping players
1. FC Kaiserslautern players
1. FC Union Berlin players
1. FC Köln players
Superettan players
Allsvenskan players
2. Bundesliga players
Bundesliga players
Swedish expatriate footballers
Swedish expatriate sportspeople in Germany
Expatriate footballers in Germany
Footballers from Skåne County